Goyang National Baseball Training Stadium is a baseball stadium in Goyang, South Korea. The stadium is used by the Goyang Dinos of the KBO Futures League.

The construction started on December 8, 2009, and was finished on August 8, 2011. It is also a temporary home stadium and club training center for Goyang Dinos.

It is also used as a training ground for the national baseball team of Korea. From 2012 to 2014, it was used as the home stadium of the first independent baseball team in Korea and the training ground for the club.

References

Baseball venues in South Korea
Sports venues in Gyeonggi Province
NC Dinos
Sports venues completed in 2011
2011 establishments in South Korea